

Kurt Cuno (27 August 1896  – 14 July 1961) was a German general in the Wehrmacht during World War II who commanded the 233d Reserve Panzer Division. He was a recipient of the Knight's Cross of the Iron Cross of Nazi Germany.

Awards and decorations
 Iron Cross (1914) 2nd Class (27 May 1916) & 1st Class (20 August 1916)
 Wound Badge in Black (30 June 1918) & in Silver (19 March 1942)
 Clasp to the Iron Cross (1939) 2nd Class (1 July 1941) & 1st Class (10 July 1941)
 Panzer Badge in Silver (18 August 1941)
 Eastern Front Medal (25 August 1942)
 German Cross in Gold on 14 January 1942 as Oberst with Panzer-Regiment 39
 Knight's Cross of the Iron Cross on  18 January 1942 as Oberst and commander of Panzer-Regiment 39

References

Citations

Bibliography

 
 
 

1896 births
1961 deaths
People from Zweibrücken
People from the Palatinate (region)
Lieutenant generals of the German Army (Wehrmacht)
German Army personnel of World War I
Recipients of the clasp to the Iron Cross, 1st class
Recipients of the Gold German Cross
Recipients of the Knight's Cross of the Iron Cross
German prisoners of war in World War II
Military personnel from Rhineland-Palatinate